In voting systems, the Schwartz set is the union of all Schwartz set components. A Schwartz set component is any non-empty set S of candidates such that
 Every candidate inside the set S is pairwise unbeaten by every candidate outside S; and
 No non-empty proper subset of S fulfills the first property.

A set of candidates that meets the first requirement is also known as an undominated set.

The Schwartz set provides one standard of optimal choice for an election outcome. Voting systems that always elect a candidate from the Schwartz set pass the Schwartz criterion. The Schwartz set is named for political scientist Thomas Schwartz.

Properties
The Schwartz set is always non-empty—there is always at least one Schwartz set component.
Any two distinct Schwartz set components are disjoint.
If there is a Condorcet winner, it is the only member of the Schwartz set. If there is only one member in the Schwartz set, it is at least a weak Condorcet winner.
If a Schwartz set component contains multiple candidates, they are all in a beatpath cycle with each other, a top cycle.
Any two candidates that are in different Schwartz set components are pairwise tied with each other.

Smith set comparison
The Schwartz set is closely related to and is always a subset of the Smith set. The Smith set is larger if and only if a candidate in the Schwartz set has a pairwise tie with a candidate that is not in the Schwartz set.
For example, if
 3 voters prefer candidate A to B to C,
 1 voter prefers candidate B to C to A,
 1 voter prefers candidate C to A to B,
 1 voter prefers candidate C to B to A,
then we have A pairwise beating B, B pairwise beating C, and A tying with C in their pairwise comparison, making A the only member of the Schwartz set, while the Smith set on the other hand consists of all the candidates.

Algorithms
The Schwartz set can be calculated with the Floyd–Warshall algorithm in time Θ(n3) or with a version of Kosaraju's algorithm in time Θ(n2).

Complying methods 
The Schulze method always chooses a winner from the Schwartz set.

See also
Smith set
Condorcet criterion
Condorcet method
Preorder
Partial order

References
  In an analysis of serial decision making based on majority rule, describes the Smith set and the Schwartz set, but apparently fails to recognize that the Schwartz set can have multiple components.
  Introduces the notion of the Schwartz set at the end of the paper as a possible alternative to maximization, in the presence of cyclic preferences, as a standard of rational choice.
  Gives an axiomatic characterization and justification of the Schwartz set as a possible standard for optimal, rational collective choice.
  Proves that the Schwartz set is the set of undominated elements of the transitive closure of the pairwise preference relation.
  Discusses the Smith set (named GETCHA) and the Schwartz set (named GOCHA) as possible standards for optimal, rational collective choice.

External links
Example algorithms to calculate the Schwartz set

Voting theory